Physical Therapy is the self-titled debut of jazz fusion band Physical Therapy, and features eleven tracks. The title track was used in late 1998 for The Weather Channel's local forecast segment. "Played Me" is the only song on the album to feature vocals. Within the liner notes, Physical Therapy boasts that no drum machines or music sequencers were used. The title track was used on The Weather Channel as part of its Local on the 8's local forecast program.

Track listing
"Physical Therapy"  – 6:33 (Terry Coleman) 
"The Wet Phaze (BCB)" (Michael Fitzgerald) – 4:27
"We Just Move U" (Brian White) – 3:45
"Night of the Latin Sun("Terry Coleman) – 5:37
"Wishbone" (Brian White) – 5:38
"Digital Penatrashun"(Terry Coleman) – 3:41
"Relax Me Now"(Terry Coleman)– 4:42
"Straight Jacket" (Terry Coleman, Kevin James, Ben Monroe) – 5:19
"Commatose"Michwal )Fitzgerald Terry Coleman Ben Monroe) – 6:32
"Miles Said Play (MF)" (Terry Coleman Brian White Michael Fitzgerald Ben Monroe) – 6:12
"Played Me" (Kevin James) – 3:38

All tracks were written and performed by Brian White, Terry Coleman, Michael Fitzgerald, Ben Monroe, and except where noted in the credits.

Personnel

Terry Coleman - Bass, Keyboards, Acoustic Guitar
Michael Fitzgerald - Soprano, Alto, and Tenor saxophone, and Keyboards
Kevin James http://www.reverbnation.com/kjlive - Keyboards and vocals
Ben Monroe - drums and percussion
Brian White - Acoustic Guitar, Electric Guitar, and MIDI Guitars, and Keyboards
Bruce Purse - Mute Pocket Trumpet (Tracks 6 & 10, Noted "Courtesy of Next Plateau Records, Inc.)
Scott Alspach - Mute Trumpet and EVI (Track 10)
Ashenapi - Flute (Track 10)

Production

Executive Producer: Ben Monroe
Producers: Terry Coleman, Brian White, Michael Fitzgerald & Ben Monroe
Co-Producers: Kevin James (Tracks 8 & 11)

Production notes

All music was digitally recorded on 24-track AKAI A-DAMs using a DDA DMR12 console. All songs were recorded using real people, with no help from drum machines or music sequencers. This album was recorded at 48 K Audio Inc., St. Louis, Missouri. It was mastered by Bernie Grundman, at Bernie Grundman Mastering, Hollywood, California. Ben Monroe did primary engineering and mixing. Ron Kimbrough took the picture of the band on the inset page, while the 3D art was done by Glenn Grillo. The album was digitally recorded and released under the Sweatshop Records label; feedback was encouraged to be written to Sweatshop Records, 4625 Lee Ave., St. Louis, Missouri 63115.

References

External links
Physical Therapy Albums, Amazon.com

1992 debut albums
Physical Therapy (band) albums